Achrida is the medieval Greek and Latin name of the modern city of Ohrid.

Achrida may also refer to:
 Any one of the Eastern Orthodox Ohrid Archbishoprics
 The Latin Catholic formerly residential (arch)bishoprics with see there and the present titular Metropolitan archbishopric